Yevgeni Vladimirovich Shkilov (born 2 February 1965) is a Russian professional football coach and a former player.

Club career
He made his professional debut in the Soviet Second League in 1988 for FC Amur Blagoveshchensk.

Honours
 Russian Premier League runner-up: 1993.

References

1965 births
Living people
Soviet footballers
Russian footballers
Russian expatriate footballers
Russian Premier League players
FC Rotor Volgograd players
Hapoel Haifa F.C. players
Expatriate footballers in Israel
FC Luch Vladivostok players
Russian football managers
Association football midfielders
FC Amur Blagoveshchensk players